Rosina Ruth Lucia Park AM (24 August 191714 December 2010) was a New Zealand–born Australian author. Her best known works are the novels The Harp in the South (1948) and Playing Beatie Bow (1980), and the children's radio serial The Muddle-Headed Wombat (1951–1970), which also spawned a book series (1962–1982).

Personal history
Park was born in Auckland to a Scottish father and a Swedish mother. Her family later moved to the town of Te Kuiti further south in the North Island of New Zealand, where they lived in isolated areas.

During the Great Depression her working-class father laboured on bush roads and bridges, worked as a driver, did government relief work and became a sawmill hand. Finally, he shifted back to Auckland, where he joined the workforce of a municipal council. The family occupied public housing, known in New Zealand as a state house, and money remained a scarce commodity. Ruth Park, after attending a Catholic primary school, won a partial scholarship to secondary school, but her high-school education was broken by periods of being unable to afford to attend. She also completed an external degree course at Auckland University.

Park's first break as a professional writer came when she was hired by the Auckland Star newspaper as a journalist, but she found the assignments she was given unchallenging. Wishing to expand her horizons, she accepted a job offer from the San Francisco Examiner, but the tightening of United States' entry requirements after the bombing of Pearl Harbor forced a change of plan. Instead, she moved to Sydney, Australia, in 1942, where she had lined up a job with another newspaper.

That same year she married the budding Australian author D'Arcy Niland (1917–1967), with whom she had been corresponding as pen pals for some years, and whom she had finally met on a previous visit to Sydney. There she embarked on a career as a freelance writer. Park and Niland had five children, of whom the youngest, twin daughters Kilmeny and Deborah, went on to become book illustrators. (Park was devastated when Niland died in Sydney at the age of 49 from a heart ailment; Kilmeny also predeceased her — see the Herald obituary.) Park had eleven grandchildren and five great-grandchildren. The writer Rafe Champion is her son-in-law. In addition, Darcy Niland's brother Beresford married Ruth Park's sister Jocelyn.

Writing career
When contracted in 1942 by Ida Elizabeth Osbourne to write a serial for the ABC Children's Session, she wrote the series The Wide-awake Bunyip. When the lead actor Albert Collins died suddenly in 1951, she changed its direction and The Muddle-Headed Wombat was born, with first Leonard Teale then John Ewart in the title role. The series ended when the radio program folded in 1970. Such was its popularity that between 1962 and 1982 she wrote a series of children's books about the character.

Her first novel was The Harp in the South (1948) – a graphic story of Irish slum life in Sydney, which has been translated into 37 languages. Even though it was acclaimed by literary critics, the book proved controversial with sections of the public due to its candour, with some newspaper letter-writers calling it a cruel fantasy because as far as they were concerned, there were no slums in Sydney. However, the newly married Park and Niland did live for a time in a Sydney slum located in the rough inner-city suburb of Surry Hills and vouched for the novel's accuracy. It has never been out of print. Sydney slum life recurs in her novel for children, Playing Beatie Bow (1980).

Park built on her initial success with the 1949 publication of a follow-up novel titled the Poor Man's Orange. During the 1950s, despite the demands of raising a family, she wrote tirelessly. According to a 2010 tribute article printed in The Sydney Morning Herald and written by her literary agent Tim Curnow, she produced more than 5,000 radio scripts alone during this decade, as well as contributing numerous articles to newspapers and magazines and penning weightier works of fiction.

She subsequently wrote Missus (1985), a prequel to The Harp in the South, among other novels, and created scripts for film and television. Her autobiographies, A Fence Around the Cuckoo (1992) and Fishing in the Styx (1993), deal with her life in New Zealand and Australia respectively. She also penned a novel set in New Zealand, One-a-pecker, Two-a-pecker (1957), about gold mining in Otago. (It was later renamed The Frost and The Fire.)
 
Park never remarried. Between 1946 and 2004, she received numerous awards for her contributions to literature in both Australia and internationally. She was made a Member of the Order of Australia in 1987. (Her awards and honours are listed below.)

From 1974 to 1981 Park dwelt on Norfolk Island, where she was the co-owner of a shop selling books and gifts. Her later years, however, were spent living in the Sydney harbourside suburb of Mosman. She died in her sleep on 14 December 2010, at the age of 93.

Awards
1946 Inaugural Sydney Morning Herald-sponsored writers' competition: Best Novel award for The Harp in the South (published 1948)
1954 Catholic Book Club Choice selected: Serpent's Delight
1961 Inaugural Commonwealth Television Play Competition: British award for television play won for No Decision, with D'Arcy Niland
1962 Children's Book Council of Australia (CBCA): highly commended for The Hole in the Hill
1975 CBCA Children's Book of the Year Award Winners: highly commended for Callie's Castle
1977 Miles Franklin Award for Swords and Crowns and Rings
1977 National Book Council: highly commended for Swords and Crowns and Rings
1979 Children's Book of the Year Award Winners: highly commended for Come Danger, Come Darkness
1981 Children's Book of the Year Award Winners: won for Playing Beatie Bow
1981 Ethel Turner Prize for Young People's Literature (NSW Premier's Literary Awards): won for When the Wind Changed
1982 Parents' Choice Award for Literature: won for Playing Beatie Bow
1982 Boston Globe-Horn Book Award: for Playing Beatie Bow
1982 International Board on Books for Young People (Australia): Honour Diploma for Playing Beatie Bow
1982 Guardian Fiction Prize (UK): runner-up for Playing Beatie Bow
1986 Young Australians' Best Book Award for picture book When the Wind Changed (illustrated by Deborah Niland)
1987 Member of the Order of Australia (AM): for services to literature
1992 The Age Book of the Year#Non-fiction Award: won for A Fence around the Cuckoo
1992 Colin Roderick Award: won for A Fence around the Cuckoo, presented with the H.T. Priestley Meda(Townsville Foundation for Australian Literary Studies Award)
1993 Tilly Aston Award for Braille Book of the Year: won for A Fence around the Cuckoo
1993 Talking Book of the Year Award (Royal Blind Society) won for A Fence around the Cuckoo
1993 Talking Book of the Year Award (Royal Blind Society) won for Fishing in the Styx
1993 Lloyd O'Neil Magpie Award for services to the Australian book industry
1994 CBCA COOL Award): won for Playing Beatie Bow
1994 Honorary Doctor of Letters by the University of New South Wales
1994 Fellowship of Australian Writers, Christina Stead Award: won for Home Before Dark
1996 Bilby Award, Young Reader Award: won for When the Wind Changed (illustrated by Deborah Niland)
2004 New South Wales Premier's Literary Awards#Special Award won
2006 listed in Bulletin's 100 most influential Australians
2008 Dromkeen Medal

Bibliography

Novels

See also

 List of New Zealand literary figures

References

External links
 
 Ruth Park (1999–2000) by Kilmeny NILAND National Portrait Gallery (Australia) (Retrieved 11 June 2014)
 
 
 Ruth Park at Libraries Australia Authorities, with catalogue search (login required)
 
 

1917 births
2010 deaths
Australian children's writers
New Zealand emigrants to Australia
Miles Franklin Award winners
Members of the Order of Australia
People from Auckland
People from Te Kūiti
20th-century Australian novelists
Australian women children's writers
Australian women novelists
20th-century Australian women writers
20th-century New Zealand women writers
20th-century New Zealand novelists
New Zealand people of Scottish descent
New Zealand people of Swedish descent